The Naval Base (MarinB) is a naval unit within the Swedish Navy that has operated in various forms since 1928. The unit is mainly based within Karlskrona naval base in Karlskrona and but operations are also conducted at Berga Naval Base and Muskö naval base outside Stockholm and in Gothenburg.

Heraldry and traditions

Colour
The colour was presented to the former Karlskrona Coastal Artillery Regiment (KA 2) at Stockholm Palace by His Majesty the King Gustaf V on 1 June 1945. It was used as regimental colour by KA 2 until 1 July 2001. KA 2 was disbanded in 2000, and during a disbandment ceremony on 31 October 2000, the colour was handed over to the South Coast Naval Base, which was the unit that will carry forward the traditions of the Karlskrona Coastal Artillery Regiment. The colour is drawn by Brita Grep and embroidered by hand in insertion technique by the company Libraria. Blazon: "On red cloth in the centre the badge of the former Coastal Artillery; two gunbarrels of older pattern in saltire between a royal crown proper and a blazing grenade and waves, all in yellow. In the first corner the monogram of His Majesty the King Charles XI surmounting an erect anchor under a royal crown proper, all in yellow".

Coat of arms
The coat of the arms of the South Coast Naval Base (ÖrlB S) 1966–1990, South Coast Naval Command (MKS) 1990–2000 and the South Coast Naval Base (MarinB S) 2000–2004. Blazon: "Azure, an anchor erect surmounted  two gunbarrels of older pattern in saltire and a chief, all or".

Flag
The flag of the unit was a double swallow-tailed Swedish flag. The flag was presented to the then South Coast Naval Command (MKS/Fo 15) in 1976.

Medals
In 2007, the Marinbasens förtjänstmedalj ("Naval Base Medal of Merit") in gold and silver (MarinBGM/SM) was established. From 2001 to 2006, this medal was called Sydkustens marinbas förtjänstmedalj ("South Coast Naval Base Medal of Merit") in gold and silver (MarinbSGM/SM) and was of 8th size. Before 2001, it was called Sydkustens marinkommandos förtjänstmedalj (MKSGM/SM) ("South Coast Naval Command Medal of Merit"). The medal ribbon is of dark blue moiré. The navys coat of arms is attached to the ribbon.

Heritage
The Naval Base with Blekingegruppen, Kalmargruppen and Kronobergsgruppen has primarily the traditional heritage responsibility of the South Coast Naval Base, the East Coast Naval Base and Muskö naval shipyards (Muskö örlogsvarv) and older ships, which bore the same name as the naval base's current ships. Secondarily the traditional heritage responsibility is for all older naval regional units (commands) such as naval commands (MKS, MKV, MKO, MKN), naval bases (ÖrlB S, ÖrlB V, ÖrlB O including ÖrlBNO/Örlbavd Ro, ÖrlBNN), naval districts (BoMö and BoLu), naval districts MDS, MDÖS, MDV, MDO, MDG and MDN) and naval stations with their staffs as well as naval surveillance and base units.

Commanding officers

1928–1933: Rear admiral Charles de Champs
1933–1936: Rear admiral Claës Lindsström
1936–1938: Rear admiral Gunnar Bjurner
1938–1942: Rear admiral Hans Simonsson
1942–1950: Rear admiral Gösta Ehrensvärd
1950–1958: Rear admiral Erik Samuelson
1958–1961: Rear admiral Sigurd Lagerman
1961–1966: Rear admiral Bertil Berthelsson
1963–1966: Rear admiral Stig Bergelin (acting)
1966–1974: Senior captain Hans Gottfridsson
1974–1980: Senior captain Lennart Ahrén
1980–1983: Senior captain Lennart Forsman
1983–1987: Senior captain Lennart Jedeur-Palmgren
1987–1990: Senior captain Sten Swedlund
1990–1994: Senior colonel Stefan Furenius
1994–1997: Senior captain Thomas Lundvall
1997–2000: Senior colonel Bo Wranker
2000–2003: Captain Bengt Jarvid
2003–2005: Captain Kenneth Olsson
2005–2005: Rear admiral (lower half) Anders Grenstad
2005–2007: Captain Lennart Månsson
2007–2009: Colonel Ola Truedsson
2009–2011: Captain Jan Thörnqvist
2011–2014: Captain  Håkan Magnusson
2014–2019: Captain Erik Andersson
2019–2022: Captain Håkan Nilsson
2022–20xx: Captain Fredrik Edwardson

Names, designations and locations

Footnotes

References

Notes

Print

Web

External links

 

Naval units and formations of Sweden
Military units and formations established in 1928
1928 establishments in Sweden
Karlskrona Garrison